Superior is a statutory town in Boulder County, Colorado, United States, with a small, uninhabited segment of land area extending into Jefferson County.  According to the 2020 census, the population of the city was 13,094.

History
Superior's history is one of coal mining. The first mines in the area were developed in the late 19th century. Coal was discovered on the Hake family farm in 1894, and recollections of members of pioneer families in Superior, including the Hakes and Autreys, are preserved as part of the Maria Rogers Oral History Program at the Carnegie Library for Local History in Boulder, Colorado.  The town was reportedly named after its superior quality of coal.

Mining was the major force in Superior's history until the Industrial Mine closed in 1945. Subsequently, many people moved out of the area and the Town evolved into a quiet ranching and farming community. Superior's population hovered around 250 until the late 1990s, when subdivisions were built in the town and the population rose dramatically to 9,011 by 2000.

Recent events
Marshall Fire

On December 30, 2021, the Marshall Fire, the most destructive fire in Colorado's history, destroyed over 1000 homes in Superior, the neighboring city of Louisville, and portions of unincorporated Boulder County. In Superior, approximately 378 homes (14% of the single-family homes in the town) were destroyed and 58 were damaged, 7 commercial properties were destroyed and 30 damaged, and there were 2 fatalities.

The fire started in Boulder County land to the west and was driven by  wind gusts across extremely dry grasses and fuels before reaching the town.  It spread rapidly and unexpectedly, prompting the temporary evacuation of 13,000 people in Superior and 21,000 in Louisville. The cause of the fire has not been officially announced, pending an investigation.  However, an incident report filed by a ranger with Boulder Open Space and Mountain Parks identified two ignition points for the fire. The first ignition point was a shed that began to burn at approximately 11:30AM MST, 30 December 2021.  The second ignition point was upwind from the first, and started around noon of the same day on "western side of the Marshall Mesa trailhead". 

Vigorous recovery and rebuilding efforts are ongoing as of February 2023, supported in part by a Federal Emergency Management Agency (FEMA) disaster declaration and numerous local government and nonprofit organizations.

Geography
Superior is located at  (39.93119, −105.159085), about 15 minutes from downtown Boulder, 30 minutes from downtown Denver, and 35 minutes from Denver International Airport, and easy access to extensive regional open space and trail systems.  It is bordered by the city of Louisville to the northeast, the city of Broomfield to the east and south, Rocky Flats National Wildlife Refuge to the south, and Boulder County open space to the west. U.S. Highway 36, also known as the Denver-Boulder Turnpike, runs along the northeast boundary of the town, and Colorado Route 128A runs along the south.

Amenities and recreation
As of 2023, Superior has  of parks and open space, which is about 31% of its total land area. This includes owned natural space, natural space under conservation easements, and developed open space. Recreational amenities include 13 playgrounds, 6 pickleball courts, 4 tennis courts, 3 multipurpose fields, 3 baseball/softball fields, 2 outdoor pools, 3 basketball courts, 2 sand volleyball courts, 1 dog park, 1 bike park, 1 skate park, and 1 disk golf course.

The Superior Community Center serves as a public venue for diverse uses.

Demographics

As of the 2020 United States census, there were 13,094 people and 4,424 households in Superior. Additional demographic information is available from the US Census profile of Superior and US Census Quick Facts about Superior. Data here are from the 2020 census  and 2020 American Community Survey (ACS) 5-year estimates for 2016-2020.

Age distribution estimates showed 5.6% of the population under age 5, 29.2% under age 18, 6.6% from 18 to 24, 28.5% from 25 to 44, 28.4% from 45 to 64, and 7.4% 65 or older. Females were 50.9% of the population, and the median age was 36.3 years.

The racial makeup of the town was 76.1% White alone, 69.9% White alone and not Hispanic
or Latino, 18.8% Asian alone, 6.9% Hispanic or Latino, and 3.6% two or more races, with less than 1% in any other category. A language other than English was spoken at home by 20.1% of the population.

Family and household characteristics included 65.0% married-couple families, 13.0% family households with a male householder and no spouse present, and 16.9% family households with a female householder and no spouse present. The average household size was 2.87 and the average family size was 3.36.
 
Of the 5,025 housing units, 
61.5% were owner-occupied. The median value of owner-occupied housing units for 2016-2020 was $603,600. The median gross rent for the same period was $2,060.

The median income for a household (in 2020 dollars) for 2016-2020 was $126,600 +/- $15,678, and median per capita income was $50,932. The employment rate was 75.3%. About 4.0% of the population were living below the poverty line, and 3.6% were without health care coverage.

Education characteristics of residents 25 years and over were that 94.9% were high school graduates, 76.2% held a bachelor's degree or higher, and 33.2% held a graduate or professional degree.

Educational Institutions
Superior is part of the Boulder Valley School District (BVSD) and is home to two public schools: Superior Elementary and Eldorado PK-8. The home public high school is Monarch High School in neighboring Louisville. Nearby institutions of higher education include the University of Colorado at Boulder, Naropa University in Boulder, and Front Range Community College campuses in Longmont and Westminster.

In popular culture 
Sections of the 1985 movie American Flyers were filmed in Superior.

Notable people 
Marcelo Balboa – soccer star
Josh Sims – Lacrosse player

See also

Outline of Colorado
Index of Colorado-related articles
State of Colorado
Colorado cities and towns
Colorado municipalities
Colorado counties
Boulder County, Colorado
Boulder Valley School District
Jefferson County, Colorado
Jefferson County R-1 School District
List of statistical areas in Colorado
Front Range Urban Corridor
North Central Colorado Urban Area
Denver-Aurora-Boulder, CO Combined Statistical Area
Boulder, CO Metropolitan Statistical Area
Denver-Aurora-Broomfield, CO Metropolitan Statistical Area
Jefferson Parkway
Rocky Flats National Wildlife Refuge

References

External links
Town of Superior
CDOT map of Superior
Superior Observer (Superior's Weekly Newspaper)
Superior Elementary School

Towns in Boulder County, Colorado
Towns in Jefferson County, Colorado
Towns in Colorado
Denver metropolitan area